Never Ever may refer to:

Music

EPs
Never Ever (Jiyeon EP), 2014
Never Ever (Weep EP), 2008

Songs
"Never Ever" (All Saints song), 1997
"Never Ever" (Ayumi Hamasaki song), 2001
"Never Ever" (Ciara song), 2009
"Never Ever" (The Rubens song), featuring Sarah Aarons, 2018
"Never Ever", song by Caro Emerald from the 2017 EP Emerald Island
"Never Ever", song by Meghan Trainor from Only 17 (album), 2011

Films
Never Ever (1996 film), a 1996 film by director Charles Finch
Never Ever (2016 film), a 2016 film by Benoît Jacquot

See also
"Neva Eva", 2003 song by Trillville
Never Never (disambiguation)